The Silverbulletday Stakes is an American Thoroughbred horse race run annually each January at Fair Grounds Race Course in New Orleans, Louisiana. A race for three-year-old fillies, it is contested on dirt over a distance of one mile and 70 yards.

Previously known as the Tiffany Lass Stakes, it was renamed in 2011 to honor U.S. Racing Hall of Fame inductee Silverbulletday.

Records
Speed  record:
 1-70 yds. - 1:42.34 – Believe You Can (2012)

Most wins by a jockey:
 3 - John Velazquez    (1998, 2003 & 2005)
 3 - Florent Geroux    (2015, 2016 & 2018)

Most wins by a trainer:
 4 - D. Wayne Lukas    (1984, 1986, 1989 & 1995)

Winners of the Silverbulletday Stakes since 2009

See also
Road to the Kentucky Oaks

References

Fair Grounds Race Course
Flat horse races for three-year-old fillies
Horse races in New Orleans
Horse racing
Recurring sporting events established in 1982
1982 establishments in Louisiana